The 2012–13 curling season began at the end of August 2012 and ended in April 2013.

Note: In events with two genders, the men's tournament winners is listed before the women's tournament winners.

CCA-sanctioned events
This section lists events sanctioned by and/or conducted by the Canadian Curling Association (CCA). The following events in bold have been confirmed by the CCA as are part of the 2012–13 Season of Champions programme.

Other events
Note: Events that were not placed on the CCA's list of CCA-sanctioned events are listed here.

World Curling Tour
Grand Slam events in bold.

Teams

Men's events

Women's events

WCT Order of Merit rankings

WCT Money List

The Dominion MA CupThe Dominion MA Cup (presented by TSN) was contested in the 2012–13 season. The Cup was awarded to the Canadian Curling Association Member Association (MA) who has had the most success during the season in CCA-sanctioned events. Events included the Canadian mixed championship, men's and women's juniors championships, the Scotties, the Brier, the men's and women's senior championships and the national wheelchair championship. Points were awarded based on placement in each of the events, with the top association receiving 14 points, the 2nd place team with 13, etc.

StandingsFinal standings''

References

External links
World Curling Tour Home
Season of Champions Home
Curling Champions Tour Home
International bonspiel calendar

2012-13
2012-13
Seasons in curling